Narodychi is an urban-type settlement in Korosten Raion, Zhytomyr Oblast, northern Ukraine. It was the administrative center of the former Narodychi Raion, and after the reform in 2020, the city became part of the Korosten Raion. It lies on the northern side of the Uzh River, 134 kilometres northwest of Kyiv. Population:

History
Narodytchi is located in the historic region of Polesia. Narodytchi was first mentioned in historical records in 1545. According to the census of 1897, the total population is 4576 including 2054 Jewish inhabitants. It attained the status of an urban-type settlement in 1958.

The Chernobyl disaster in 1986 had an extremely negative impact on all spheres of life in Narodychi. According to the Cabinet of Ministers of Ukraine dated July 23, 1991 Narodichi was evacuated and was one of the worst hit areas by the radiation, affecting some 93,000 people in the Narodychi town and surrounding raion, 20,000 of which were children. This led to the cessation of all industrial enterprises and  one of two secondary schools were closed. On the streets of Narodichi are many abandoned houses and dilapidated  buildings of educational and medical institutions, etc. Vital functions of the town however are gradually being established.

Geography
It lies on the northern side of the Uzh River, 107 km northeast of Zhytomyr and 134 km northwest of Kyiv.

Economy
Narodychi contains several industrial companies, including a bakery, a plant for the production of technical tapes (CP "tape") and a joint Bulgarian-Ukrainian producer of sewing accessories Ltd. ("TWI TKF"), although agriculture is practiced by most of the people, with extensive fields in the town and suburbs. The town has gymnasium, kindergarten, children's art house and central regional hospital.

See also
Chernobyl Exclusion Zone

References

External links

Urban-type settlements in Korosten Raion
Ovruchsky Uyezd
Korosten Raion